Nutshell is a web and mobile customer relationship management (CRM) and email marketing automation service. It is composed of a web application, as well as mobile applications for the iOS and Android platforms. Nutshell is headquartered in downtown Ann Arbor, Michigan.

History 

Nutshell was launched at the Future of Web Design conference in November, 2010. In 2011, Nutshell launched its integration with Google Apps. In 2014, the company sponsored the SXSW Interactive Festival Later that year, veteran tech investor Joe Malcoun was brought on as CEO.

Integrations 

Nutshell integrates with other SaaS services for small businesses.

In March 2014, Nutshell discontinued its integration with LinkedIn, in response to LinkedIn's lockout of API access to CRMs, including Nutshell, Zoho and Capsule.

See also 

Comparison of CRM systems
Customer relationship management

References

External links 
 

Customer relationship management software